The Classical Receptions Journal is a peer reviewed academic journal of reception studies, covering all aspects of the reception of the texts and material culture of ancient Greece and Rome from antiquity to the present day. It is published by Oxford University Press.

References

Oxford University Press academic journals
Classics journals
Publications with year of establishment missing